Therese Viklund (born 12 June 1987) is a Swedish equestrian. She represented Sweden at the 2020 Summer Olympics and competed in Individual and Team Eventing on her horse Viscera. Unusually for a horse competing in eventing, Viscera only has sight in one eye. Viklund was eliminated during the cross country phase as result of a fall.

References 

1987 births
Living people
Swedish female equestrians
Olympic equestrians of Sweden
Equestrians at the 2020 Summer Olympics
Swedish event riders